Tarzan's Secret Treasure is a 1941 Tarzan film directed by Richard Thorpe. Based on the character created by Edgar Rice Burroughs, it is the fifth in the MGM Tarzan series to star Johnny Weissmuller and Maureen O'Sullivan. Original prints of the film were processed in sepiatone.

The next film in the series would be Tarzan's New York Adventure (1942), the last in the series to feature Maureen O'Sullivan, and the last before the series moved to RKO.

Synopsis
An expedition team arrives on Tarzan's escarpment. By chance, the two villainous members Medford (Tom Conway) and Vandermeer (Philip Dorn) find out that there is plenty of gold on the escarpment. They kidnap Jane and Boy in order to make Tarzan show them the location of the gold. After Tarzan complies, Medford shoots him and mistakenly presumes he is dead. Soon the group is captured by natives, whereupon Tarzan, comes to their rescue.

Cast
 Johnny Weissmuller as Tarzan
 Maureen O'Sullivan as Jane Parker
 Johnny Sheffield as Boy (as John Sheffield)
 Reginald Owen as Professor Elliott
 Barry Fitzgerald as O'Doul
 Tom Conway as Medford
 Philip Dorn as Vandermeer
 Cordell Hickman as Tumbo
 Johnny Eck as Bird (uncredited)
 Everett Brown as Native (uncredited)

References

External links

 
 
 
 
 Tarzan's Secret Treasure history at ERBzine.com

1941 films
1940s fantasy adventure films
American black-and-white films
American fantasy adventure films
American sequel films
1940s English-language films
Films directed by Richard Thorpe
Metro-Goldwyn-Mayer films
Tarzan films
1940s American films